Sankethi (sometimes spelled Sanketi) is a South Dravidian language that is closely related to Tamil. It is sometimes considered a dialect of Kannada or Tamil, but there are considerable differences that make it unintelligible to speakers of both languages. It has strong lexical influences from Kannada (particularly in the colloquial form), as well as borrowings from Sanskrit. It is most commonly spoken in Karnataka, India by the Sankethi people, who migrated from Sengottai in Tamilnadu.

The language is most often written in the Kannada script. However, Sankethi (especially in the spoken form) has relatively higher frequencies of consonant clusters of more than two consonants and semivowels. This makes it difficult to write in the Kannada script, which would require multiple subscripted letters (ಒತ್ತಕ್ಷರ - ottakṣara). As a result, Sankethi is rarely found in printed or any written form, and has no standardized form. 

Three main dialects exist of the Sankethi language: Kaushika, Bettadpura and Lingadahalli, each associated with the three primary Sankethi communities located in Karnataka. It is worth noting that these dialects are all located in a sprachbund which includes not only Kannada but also Tulu, due to Sankethi villages being located in the Malnad region. As Sankethi has no standardized form, it can be difficult to assess what the "true" grammar and features of Sankethi is, as evidenced in the literature by H.S. Ananthanaryana and Kikkeri Narayana. The grammar and semantic features of Kannada are those most often assimilated into Sankethi, as many Sankethis are bilingual in Kannada.

Phonology 
Sankethi phonology is very similar to Kannada and Tamil, with the classical Sanskrit aspirates and retroflex laterals characteristic of many Dravidian languages. Like a few other South Indian languages including Konkani, Marathi, and Saurashtra, the language has a few uncommon aspirates:  [], [nʰ], and [ʃʰ], though both most often appear in their palatalized forms. Its presence is often marked by the presence of long vowels, as well as syllable finally (where they are often palatalized in that position). See the table below for the range of Sankethi consonants.

Sankethi vowels are very similar to Tamil vowels:

In Sankethi, some nouns that end in ಒ (o) have a final nasal sound, which is not indicated with the anusvāra when written down. This is especially prevalent in the Lingadahalli dialect.

Vocabulary 
Below is a table comparing some basic words in Sankethi, Kannada, Tamil and Thigala.

Word formation strategies 
One peculiar feature of Sankethi is its use of words and structures of both Sanskrit and Dravidian origin to form new words. A study by H.S. Ananthanarayana details a number of noun formation strategies in Sankethi.

-ಮಯು - "full of" (ex. ಪೂವಮಯು - full of flowers)

Grammar 
Nouns

Sankethi grammar is fairly similar to those of most other Dravidian languages, with six cases: nominative (unmarked), accusative, instrumental-ablative, dative, genitive, and locative. The vocative is not fully functional case, and not all nouns have a separate form for it, and as such is not included in the traditional list. The grammar detailed below pertains to the Kaushika dialect.

As in Tamil and Malayalam, there is clusivity distinction for first person plural pronouns in Sankethi: ನಾಂಗ (nānga; exclusive) VS ನಾಂಬು (nāmbu/ inclusive), though the frequency usage varies. A good example of its usage is the Sankethi endonym for the language: ಎಂಗಡೆ ವಾರ್ಥೆ (eṃgaḍe vārthe), which implies that the language belongs to the speaker and the Sankethi community, so as to distinguish it from a shared language.

Below is a table of pronouns: 

Polite versions of he and she are ಇವ್ಹು/ಅವ್ಹು (ivhu/avhu) and ಇವ್ಹೆ/ಅವ್ಹೆ (ivhe/avhe, which are increasingly considered archaic. They are most frequently replaced by ಇವ್ಹಾ/ಅವ್ಹಾ (ivhā/avhā), perhaps as an influence from Kannada. Tānga is usually found only in religious contexts, and even then, nīnga is often preferred. Tānga and nīnga  have the same inflections and verb conjugations. The use of ಇವ್ಹ್ಯ/ಅವ್ಹ್ಯ is rare, since the word was historically used to refer to people outside the Sankethi community. Eventually it acquired a more general, pejorative meaning of “those people (outsiders)”, and as such is rarely used.

Case Declension

The declensional classes are similar to Kannada, marked by animate versus inanimate and weak (ಇ, ಈ, ಎ, ಏ, ಐ) versus strong vowel (ಅ, ಆ, ಉ, ಊ, ಒ, ಓ, ಔ, ಋ) endings. Gender only exists for human nouns, and is only relevant in the third person verb conjugations. Generally, the verb classes are delineated as 1st (animate strong vowel ending), 2nd (inanimate strong vowel ending), 3rd (animate weak vowel ending), and 4th (inanimate weak vowel ending).

Though Sankethi vocabulary is not systematized, there are some general rules for taking nouns from Sanskrit, Tamil, Kannada, or Malayalam.

 Most words of Dravidian origin in Kannada that end in ಅ (a) in Kannada and Tamil/Malayalam words ending in  உ/ന് (the half u), including proper nouns, end in the half ಉ  in Sankethi.
 Words of Sanskrit origin (though there are exceptions) tend to end in ಒ (oṃ); a way to tell if this is the case is to see if the Telugu, Tamil, or Malayalam cognate ends in the anusvāra (the ṃ) or the ending -am. If it does, the word will most likely end in the nasalized oṃ, which is usually written with ಒ because there is no way to indicate a nasalized vowel in the Kannada script (as noted before). Ex. Sankethi ಪಳೊ is related to Tamil பழம், which ends in -am. Therefore, ಪಳೊ is pronounced with a final ಒಂ. 
 However, as a rule, most words that end in e in Kannada and ai in Tamil end in a in Sankethi (even if the second rule applies; is especially true of Sanskrit loans). Ex. Compare Kannada ಪ್ರಾರ್ಥನೆ (prārthane) and Tamil பிரார்த்தனை (prārthanai), which is ಪ್ರಾರ್ಥನ (prārthana) in Sankethi.

See the table below for case declensions. The nominative is the base form of a given noun, and as such is not included in the table below.

Verbs

Verbs in Sankethi have two kinds of verbs stems. There are verbs that end in ಉ/ಒ (u/o) and ಇ/ಎ (i/e). Generally speaking, they undergo the following changes during conjugation

 -ಉ/ಒ verbs (strong vowel stems) simply drop their final vowel before taking endings
 -ಇ/ಎ verbs (weak vowel stems) add the euphonic ಯ್ (y) before adding the endings. However, in speech, the ಎ is reduced to ಇ, and even then the final vowel disappears, resulting in a palatalized consonant between the stem and ending.

Below are tables that show different tenses, given for the verb ಸಾಪಡು (to eat/drink):

Non-Past Simple

*In all tenses, the ನೀ form's final -್ಯ (-ya) becomes -ಎಯ (-eya) as a question, and the ನೀಂಗ form changes from -್ಯೊ (-yo) to -ಿಳ (-iḷa) as a question.

Imperfective and Perfective Aspects

The imperfective aspect is marked by taking the gerundial form of a verb (the stem takes the ending -āṇḍu), and then attaching the conjugated form of iru in its auxiliary form (rāṇi, rāṇḍeya, etc.).  

This is contrasted with the perfect aspect, where the past participle is placed first instead of the gerundial aspect. In addition, because 

Past

The past tense in Sankethi is complex due to a number of stem rules inherited from Tamil. The past tense is also notable in that the ನೀಂಗ (nīnga) form is where Sankethi's uncommon aspirates are most visible. There a number of different kinds of past tense endings associated with certain verb endings. There are also a number of irregular verbs, with no necessarily discernible pattern.

ಪಣ್ಣು - -ಉ ending verbs

ಉಡು - -ಡು ending verbs without an stressed penultimate syllable (change to -ಟ್ಟ-)

ಸಾಪಡು - -ಡು ending verbs with an unstressed penultimate syllable

ಪಾರು - stressed long vowel as the penultimate syllable (change the final syllable to -ತು)

ಇಳಿ - -ಇ ending verbs

ಉಳು (uḷu to fall) (also ಅಳಿ, ನಡಿ)

This is a special pattern unique to ನಿಲ್ಲಿ (nilli) and -ಕ್ಯೊ (-kyo) ending verbs (ex. ತುಂಕ್ಯೊ - tuṃkyo)

The following verbs are irregular:

ಕುಡು (to give)

ಪುಡಿ (to carry)

ಚಿರಿ/ಉರಿ (to smile/peel) (add -ಚ- before adding endings)

ತೋಯಿ (to wash)

ವಯ್ಯಿ (to scold)

ಇರು (to be)

ವರು (to come)

ಪೋಹು (to go)

ಆಹು (to happen/become)

Past Perfect/Past Progressive or Remote Past

The past progressive and past perfect in Sankethi are the same, and their meaning is distinguished only by context. For this reason, the conjugations below may be referred to jointly as the remote past.

Future

This is a hypothetical construction for the future tense in Sankethi, though it functions more like a hypothetical ("Shall I...?"). C.T. Dathathreya reconstructs this set of conjugations by referring to Tamil and Kannada conjugations for the future tense. In a literary or poetic context, it would likely imply the future tense, and when appearing as an instruction, it has the jussive meaning of "must do" or the passive meaning "will be done". Dathathreya refers to this as the "future indefinite", suggesting a distant (hence very hypothetical) circumstance.

Negation

Negation is indicated by suffixing the appropriate ending, and similar to Kannada, there are separate forms for each tense. Again, the example verb is ಸಾಪಡು (sāpaḍu). Some Sankethi speakers negate with the ending -ಅಲ್ಲೆ (alle) and others with -ಅಲ್ಲ (alla). It varies with the generation of the speakers and their proximity to Tamil or Kannada communities. The negative future is a hypothetical construction based on C.T. Dathathreya's reconstruction.

Present: ಸಾಪಡಲ್ಲ (sāpaḍalla)

Present Progressive: ಸಾಪಡರಾಂಡಿಕ್ಕಲ್ಲ (sāpaḍarāṃḍikkalla)

Past/Present Perfect: ಸಾಪಡಿಕ್ಕಲ್ಲ (sāpaḍikkalla)

Past Progressive: ಸಾಪಡಾನ್ನಿಂದಲ್ಲ (sāpaḍānnindalla)

Future: ಸಪಡವಿಲ್ಲ (sāpaḍavilla)

Imperative

Prohibitive

See also
 Sankethi people
 Languages of India
 List of Indian languages by total speakers

References

Dr.Shrikaanth K.Murthy- Article in Sanketi Sangama, February 2006 (Published from Shimoga)
Dravidabhashavijnana by Hampa Nagarajaiah (Published by D.V.K.Murthy publishers, Mysore, India)
Sanketi jananga, samskruti mattu bhashe- C.S.Ramachandarao (Published by Chaitra Pallavi Publishers, Mysore)
Nacharammana Jivana Carite- M. Keshaviah (published from Mysore)
Shreyash S -Article in Sanketi Sangama [Published by Chaitra Pallavi Publishers, Bangalore]

Dravidian languages
Karnataka society
Languages of India
Tamil dialects
Endangered diaspora languages